Wirts House is a historic home located at Straban Township, Adams County, Pennsylvania. It is a two-story, rectangular log / wood-frame vernacular Federal style dwelling.  It is covered in wooden clapboard siding and sits on a rubble stone foundation. The original section dates to about 1765, with a "back building" addition built between about 1786 and 1812 and a two-story addition built between about 1825 and 1830.

It was listed on the National Register of Historic Places in 1992.

References

Houses on the National Register of Historic Places in Pennsylvania
Federal architecture in Pennsylvania
Houses in Adams County, Pennsylvania
National Register of Historic Places in Adams County, Pennsylvania